Ghazal Al Banat can refer to:
 A sweet similar to cotton candy, essentially identical to Persian pashmak.
 The Flirtation of Girls, 1949 Egyptian film.

The term literally translates as "threads/flirtation of girls"; see ghazal for more.